Castniomera is a monotypic moth genus in the family Castniidae described by Constant Vincent Houlbert in 1918. Its single species, Castniomera atymnius, the giant butterfly-moth, was first described by Johan Wilhelm Dalman in 1824. It is known from Mexico through Central America to Venezuela.

The larvae feed on Musaceae species.

Subspecies
Castniomera atymnius atymnius (eastern Brazil, French Guiana, Colombia)
Castniomera atymnius drucei (Schaus, 1911) (Colombia, Costa Rica)
Castniomera atymnius ecuadorensis (Houlbert, 1917) (Ecuador)
Castniomera atymnius futilis (Walker, 1856) (Nicaragua, Mexico, Honduras, Panama)
Castniomera atymnius humboldti (Boisduval, [1875]) (Colombia)
Castniomera atymnius immaculata (Lathy, 1922) (French Guiana)
Castniomera atymnius newmanni (Houlbert, 1917) (Panama to Colombia, Venezuela)

References

Castniidae
Castniidae of South America
Moths of South America